Herro Kader Mustafa (born 1973) is an American diplomat who had served as the American ambassador to Bulgaria between October 2019 - February 2023. She carries the rank of Minister Counselor.

Early life and education
Mustafa was born in Erbil, in Kurdistan Region, Iraq, to a Kurdish family and spent two years of her childhood in a refugee camp. Mustafa's family story was the subject of the documentary film American Herro. She is multilingual and speaks English, Kurdish, Arabic, Turkish, Spanish and Greek.

Mustafa's family sought asylum in the United States in 1976. Her father was a Kurdish political activist and an opponent of the regime of Saddam Hussein. The family was taken in by Zion Lutheran Church at Minot, North Dakota in 1976.

Mustafa graduated from Minot High School in 1991 and earned her undergraduate degree from the Edmund A. Walsh School of Foreign Service at Georgetown University in 1995 where she studied national security and the Middle East. She also received a master's degree in international relations from the Woodrow Wilson School of Public and International Affairs at Princeton University in 1997.

Career
After graduation, she directed a non-governmental organization for Kurdish studies in the U.S., traveled to Bosnia to supervise provincial elections and served as the Senior Editor for the Emirates Center for Strategic Studies and Research in Abu Dhabi, United Arab Emirates.

Mustafa joined the United States Foreign Service in 1999 and served in Athens (as a Political Officer for human rights and trafficking), Beirut (as a consular official), Washington, D.C. (as Iran desk officer at the National Security Council under Elliot Abrams), and special assistant to Secretary of State Condoleezza Rice and Under Secretary of State for Political Affairs William J. Burns, and Iraq (as Coalition Provisional Authority coordinator for Nineveh under L. Paul Bremer).

Mustafa was senior advisor on the Middle East to Vice President Joe Biden from March 2009 to 2011.

Mustafa once served as Political Minister Counselor at the United States Embassy in India, and has been Deputy Chief of Mission at the United States Embassy in Portugal since July 2016.

Ambassador to Portugal
Mustafa was United States chargée d'affaires in Portugal (i.e. acting Ambassador) from the end of Robert A. Sherman's term as Ambassador on January 20, 2017 to August 25, 2017, when she was replaced by George Edward Glass also as Ambassador. She drew notice for being a Muslim former refugee serving the Donald Trump administration.

Ambassador to Bulgaria
In June 2019, President Donald Trump nominated Mustafa to be the ambassador to Bulgaria. Her nomination was unanimously confirmed by the Senate on September 26, 2019. She presented her credentials to President Rumen Radev on October 18, 2019.

Awards and recognition
Mustafa has been nominated for the Department of State Human Rights and Democracy Achievement award and has received the Superior Honor Award and Meritorious Honor Award for her work.

References

1973 births
Living people
Ambassadors of the United States to Bulgaria
American people of Kurdish descent
Walsh School of Foreign Service alumni
Governors of Nineveh Governorate
Iraqi Kurdish women
People from Erbil
United States Department of State officials
United States Foreign Service personnel
Princeton School of Public and International Affairs alumni
21st-century American diplomats
American women ambassadors
21st-century American women
American women diplomats